Krumme Lutter is a river of Lower Saxony, Germany.

The Krumme Lutter is one of the two headstreams of the Lutter in the southern Harz, north of Bad Lauterberg in the district of Göttingen. It rises below 620 m on the Aschentalshalbe and flows towards the south past the former pits Wolkenhügel and Hoher Trost, before it unites with the Grade Lutter in Kupferhütte to become the Lutter.

See also 
List of rivers of Lower Saxony

References 

Rivers of Lower Saxony
Rivers of the Harz
Rivers of Germany